This is a list of the series that have run in the Shueisha manga anthology book Weekly Shōnen Jump. This list is organized by decade and year of each series' first publication, and lists every single notable series run in the manga magazine, along with the author of each series and the series' finishing date if applicable.

1960s

1968–1969

1970s

1970–1971

1972–1973

1974–1975

1976–1977

1978–1979

1980s

1980–1984

1985–1989

1990s

1990–1994

1995–1999

2000s

2000–2004

2005–2009

2010s

2010–2014

2015–2019

2020s

2020–present

Monthly Shōnen Jump holdovers
During the changeover of monthly magazines between Monthly Shōnen Jump and Jump SQ. in 2007, four monthly series ran stories in the WSJ magazine. Of the four, Claymore ran several one-shot extra chapters.

References

Manga magazines published in Japan
Lists of manga series